Rhein-Selz is a Verbandsgemeinde ("collective municipality") in the district Mainz-Bingen in Rhineland-Palatinate, Germany. It takes its name from the two rivers Rhine and Selz. It is situated on the left bank of the Rhine, south of Mainz. It was formed on 1 July 2014 by the merger of the former Verbandsgemeinden Nierstein-Oppenheim and Guntersblum. Its seat is in Oppenheim.

The Verbandsgemeinde consists of the following Ortsgemeinden ("local municipalities"):

{|
|- valign=top
|
 Dalheim
 Dexheim
 Dienheim
 Dolgesheim
 Dorn-Dürkheim
 Eimsheim
 Friesenheim
 Guntersblum
 Hahnheim
 Hillesheim
||
 Köngernheim
 Ludwigshöhe
 Mommenheim
 Nierstein
 Oppenheim
 Selzen
 Uelversheim
 Undenheim
 Weinolsheim
 Wintersheim
|}

Verbandsgemeinde in Rhineland-Palatinate